The Digos River is a river in the city of Digos in Davao del Sur province of the Philippines, flowing into Davao Gulf.

Rivers of the Philippines